Ernest William Toser (30 November 1912 – 25 March 2002) was an English professional footballer who played in the Football League for Millwall and Notts County as a centre half. He is best remembered for his time in non-League football with Dulwich Hamlet, for whom he served as a player and a member of the backroom staff.

Personal life 
Toser served in the Royal Air Force during the Second World War. He also served as a PE instructor at Sevenoaks School and later worked as a teacher.

Career statistics

Honours 
Dulwich Hamlet

 FA Amateur Cup: 1933–34, 1936–37

References 

1912 births
2002 deaths
English Football League players
English footballers
Association football wing halves
Footballers from Greater London
Eton Manor F.C. players
Redhill F.C. players
Dulwich Hamlet F.C. players
Isthmian League players
Clapton Orient F.C. wartime guest players
Millwall F.C. players
Notts County F.C. players
Bognor Regis Town F.C. players
Bognor Regis Town F.C. managers
England youth international footballers
Rochdale A.F.C. wartime guest players
Royal Air Force personnel of World War II
English schoolteachers
English football managers